Vixia Herbeira, near Santo André de Teixido (municipality of Cedeira) in Galicia (north-west Spain),  is one of the highest cliff faces in Europe. It is 621 metres high.

External links

 
 :es:Capelada

Cliffs of Spain
Landforms of Galicia (Spain)